John McAllister Schofield (September 29, 1831 – March 4, 1906) was an American soldier who held major commands during the American Civil War. He was appointed U.S. Secretary of War (1868–1869) under President Andrew Johnson and later served as Commanding General of the United States Army (1888–1895).

Early life
John McAllister Schofield was born September 29, 1831, in Gerry, Chautauqua County, New York, the son of the Reverend James Schofield (1801–1888) and his first wife, the former Caroline (McAllister) Schofield (1810–1857). His father, a Baptist minister in Sinclairville became a domestic missionary and moved his family (which then included six children and would include 10 who survived infancy) to Bristol, Illinois. When John was 12, they finally settled in Freeport, Illinois, where Rev. Schofield became the town's first Baptist minister in 1845, and where he was ultimately buried in 1888.

As a young man John Schofield was educated in the public schools, helped his family farm and build their home, and then surveyed land in northern Wisconsin before spending a year teaching school in Oneco, Illinois not far from Freeport. Then U.S. Rep. Thomas J. Turner secured John Schofield an appointment to the United States Military Academy at West Point. He sold land for travel expenses and reported on June 1, 1849. In his final year at the Academy, while a teaching assistant in the mathematics section, cadet Schofield was accused of allowing others in his classroom to make offensive jokes and drawings on the blackboard. He was dismissed from West Point, but after meeting with Illinois' U.S. Senator Stephen A. Douglas, appealed the decision to the Secretary of War, who referred the matter back to a Board of Inquiry at the Academy. A majority of the review board voted to rescind the expulsion, but one of the two officers who voted to sustain it, cavalry and artillery instructor Lt. George H. Thomas, later became a commander of Schofield during the Civil War. Although Schofield's eventual memoirs did not mention Thomas on the review board, his persistent criticism of Thomas's generalship after the war may reflect this incident. Schofield graduated in 1853, ranking seventh in his class, and was commissioned a brevet second lieutenant in the artillery.

Schofield served for two years in the artillery. His first post was at Fort Moultrie, South Carolina, which he later noted involved the same guns that were used to bombard Fort Sumter in 1861. He then served at various places in Florida during the armed truce with the Seminole Nation, but contracted fevers and dysentery and was ultimately evacuated (with the assistance of future Confederate General A. P. Hill) and recovered at Culpeper, Virginia.

Upon regaining his health, First Lieutenant Schofield returned to West Point as assistant professor of natural and experimental philosophy from 1855 to 1860. His career seemed stalled, so he took leave (1860–1861), to work as professor of physics at Washington University in St. Louis. Several of his brothers had settled in St. Louis, following the lead of his eldest brother Rev. James Van Pelt Schofield (1825–1898).

Civil War
When the Civil War broke out, Schofield helped assure Missouri did not join the Confederacy. He became a major in the 1st Missouri Infantry Regiment and served as chief of staff to Maj. Gen. Nathaniel Lyon until Lyon's death during the Battle of Wilson's Creek (Missouri) in August 1861. Schofield acted with "conspicuous gallantry" during the battle, and decades later received the Medal of Honor for that action.

Schofield was promoted to brigadier general of volunteers on November 21, 1861. From 1861 to 1863 he held various commands in the Trans-Mississippi Theater. He commanded the District of St Louis from that date to 10 April 1862, the Military District of Missouri from 5 June to 24 September 1862, and the District of Southwest Missouri to 10 November 1862. He led the Army of the Frontier from 12 October 1862 to 30 May 1863. He was promoted to major general of volunteers on November 29, 1862 at the age of 31, making him one of the youngest major generals in the Civil War.

On 30 September 1862, a Federal brigade suffered a defeat at the First Battle of Newtonia in southwest Missouri. Both James G. Blunt and Schofield rushed to Newtonia, Missouri with reinforcements and sent the Confederate force fleeing south into Arkansas. The department commander Samuel Ryan Curtis created the Army of the Frontier with Schofield in command. Blunt led the 1st Division, James Totten the 2nd Division, and Francis J. Herron the 3rd Division. The army numbered 20,000 men, but probably 14,000 were fit for duty. Schofield's army crossed into northwest Arkansas on 17 October. Blunt's division soon moved west into Indian Territory where it won the Battle of Old Fort Wayne on 22 October. Meanwhile, Schofield with the 2nd and 3rd Divisions occupied Huntsville, Arkansas. Schofield's troops clashed with forces led by Thomas C. Hindman, and the Confederates retreated south on 29 October. On 4 November, with the approval of Curtis, Schofield's two divisions withdrew northeast to Springfield, Missouri while Blunt's division remained in northwest Arkansas.

He was eventually relieved of duty in the West, at his own request, due to altercations with his superior Samuel R. Curtis.

From 17 April to 10 May 1863, Schofield led the 3rd Division in the XIV Corps, Army of the Cumberland. He returned to Missouri as commander of the Department of Missouri from 24 May 1863 to 30 January 1864. His command in Missouri was marred by controversy after a massacre at Lawrence, Kansas, when Schofield refused to allow a posse to pursue the combatants into Missouri. Pro-Union Missourians sent a delegation to Washington DC in October to plead with President Lincoln to dismiss Schofield for sympathizing with pro-Confederate Bushwhacker para-military marauders who were attacking loyal Union citizens. Lincoln backed Schofield's position, attributed the carnage to wartime conditions rather than the commander's inadequacy, and instructed Schofield to respect civil liberties unless assemblies or newspapers were working palpable harm to the military.

In 1864, as commander of the Army of the Ohio, Schofield participated in the Atlanta Campaign under Major General William T. Sherman. Sherman placed him in command of a major operation to break the rail lines in late July 1864. Schofield became embroiled in another controversy with the commander of the US XIV Corps (Volunteer), Major General John Palmer, who resigned rather than serve under Schofield, whom he considered to be of lower rank, but whom Gen. Sherman backed, at Utoy Creek (becoming the only resignation during a major operation in U.S. history, although Palmer was ultimately reassigned to Kentucky and helped maintain federal control over that border state). Schofield with his XXIII Corps and the XIV Corps then spent the month in front of Atlanta and East Point with lackluster results. Sherman resorted to a flanking movement to defeat the Confederates under Hood. Schofield was sent to cut off Hardee's retreat at Jonesboro but failed to move. He became embroiled in a further controversy, when placed under General Stanley commanding the US IV Corps, on August 30, 1864.

Sherman, after the fall of Atlanta, took the majority of his forces on a March to the Sea through Georgia. Schofield's Army of the Ohio was detached to join Major General George H. Thomas in Tennessee. When Confederate General John Bell Hood invaded Tennessee and nearly cut off Schofield's command at Spring Hill, Hood's rash assault to regain momentum at the subsequent Battle of Franklin resulted in a significant defeat. On December 15–16, Schofield took part in Thomas's crowning victory at the Battle of Nashville where Hood's Army of Tennessee was decisively defeated, and effectively destroyed as a fighting force for the remainder of the war. However, during the buildup towards the battle Schofield intrigued against Thomas, feeding Grant false information, in order to try to succeed his senior in command. For his services at Franklin he was awarded the rank of brigadier general in the regular army on November 30, 1864, and the brevet rank of major general on March 13, 1865.

Ordered to operate with Sherman in North Carolina, Schofield moved his corps by rail and sea to Fort Fisher, North Carolina, in 17 days, occupied Wilmington on February 22, 1865, fought the action at Kinston on March 10, and on March 23, joined Sherman at Goldsboro.

Reconstruction
After the war, President Andrew Johnson sent Schofield on a special diplomatic mission to France, urging withdrawal of French troops in Mexico.  General Schofield also joined the Military Order of the Loyal Legion of the United States, a military society composed of officers of the Union armed forces and their descendants. After retiring from active duty, Schofield served as the Order's commander-in-chief (from 1899 to 1903).

During Reconstruction, President Johnson appointed Schofield to serve as military governor of Virginia and of the First Military District. Thus, he oversaw the elections (in which blacks and whites voted) which resulted in the Virginia Constitutional Convention of 1868. When Radicals took over that convention and proposed to disenfranchise former Confederates Schofield voiced concerns about corruption to Congress as well as his commander, General Ulysses Grant. Schofield's position was of high importance and sensitivity, due to the region's proximity to Washington as well as Confederate President Jefferson Davis's incarceration in Norfolk and awaiting trial under Judge John Curtiss Underwood, who chaired the Constitutional Convention and had close links with Congressional Republicans. After President Johnson forced Edwin M. Stanton, a Radical Republican who had served as Secretary of War since 1862, to resign, Schofield served as Secretary of War from June 1868 to March 1869.

Postbellum career

Schofield was promoted to major general in the Regular Army on March 4, 1869, the same day General Ulysses S. Grant was sworn in as president of the United States. Schofield then served for a year as head of the Department of Missouri, the Army's second largest military department.

Following General George Thomas' death, Schofield succeeded him in commanding the Military Division of the Pacific, the country's largest.

In 1873, Schofield was given a secret task by Secretary of War William Belknap to investigate the strategic potential of a United States presence in the Hawaiian Islands. Schofield's report recommended that the United States establish a naval port at Pearl Harbor.

Starting in 1876 until 1881, Schofield became superintendent of the United States Military Academy. A major focus was reducing hazing and increasing professionalism within the academy. In 1878, Schofield drew the ire of Radical Republicans when President Rutherford B. Hayes asked him to reopen the case of Major General Fitz John Porter, who had been convicted by a court-martial for cowardice and disobedience at the Second Battle of Bull Run. Schofield's review board used new evidence from Confederate generals who had participated in the battle, and then found that Porter had been wrongly convicted and that his actions might have saved the entire Union army from complete defeat caused by the ineptitude of Maj. Gens. John Pope and Irvin McDowell.

On April 5, 1880, an African American cadet at West Point, Johnson Chesnut Whittaker, was found bruised and beaten in his cot. He claimed that he had been attacked by fellow cadets, but the administration claimed he had fabricated his story to win sympathy. Whittaker was court-martialed and expelled for allegedly faking an assault on himself staged by his fellow cadets. A Congressional investigation into the incident resulted in Schofield's removal from his post as superintendent in 1881.

Schofield then served in the Department of the Gulf (1881–82), the Military Division of the Pacific (1882–83), the Military Division of the Missouri (1883–86), and the Military Division of the Atlantic (1886–88). He also went to France to witness military maneuvers there. Gen. Schofield was also the first President of the Army and Navy Club (founded 1885, incorporated 1891).

Upon the death of General Philip Sheridan in 1888, General Schofield, by virtue of his seniority in rank, became the commanding general of the United States Army. He supported military professionalism, including subordination to the civilian Secretary of War. Schofield also supported adoption of lineal promotions and initiated performance reviews which limited political patronage considerations from the promotion process. Writing from South Dakota, General Schofield seconded a report of General Thomas H. Ruger which urged the federal government to honor treaty obligations with Native Americans.

General Schofield received the Medal of Honor on July 2, 1892 for his actions at the Battle of Wilson's Creek in 1861.  During the unrest of the Pullman Strike, Schofield worked with President Cleveland in a discreet advisory role.  On February 5, 1895, he was promoted to the rank of lieutenant general. Lieutenant General Schofield retired on September 29, 1895, upon reaching the mandatory retirement age of 64.

However, he remained active in government affairs, supporting Elihu Root, testifying before congressional committees in support of the Army Reorganization Act of 1901 and the Dick Act of 1903 which established the U.S. National Guard.

Personal life

John Schofield married Harriet Whitehorn Bartlett, daughter of W.F.C. Bartlett (Chairman of West Point's Department of Philosophy) and they had two daughters and four sons. Two sons, John (1858–1868) and Henry (1862–1863), died before reaching adulthood. William Bartlett Schofield, 1860–1906) survived to and began a U.S. Army career, rising to Major, as did Richmond McAlister Schofield (1867–1941). After Harriet died in 1888, she was buried with her father and son John in the United States Military Academy Post cemetery.

At age 60, in Keokuk, Iowa in June 1891, Schofield remarried, to 27-year-old Georgia Wells Kilbourne, with whom he had a daughter, Georgiana. Georgia Wells Kilbourne was a native of Keokuk, Iowa. She was the daughter of George Kilbourne, and was named Georgia for her father. She attended school in New York, and afterwards studied abroad. General Schofield and Kilbourne were married in 1891. Her mother, Mrs. Kilbourne, and her younger sister, Miss Emma Kilbourne, spent a part of the year at her Washington home. Emma Kilbourne had a literary predilection, devoting much of her time to reading and study.

During his military career, perhaps because of his reformer image, Schofield was dogged by accusations of favoritism toward family members. His brother George Wheeler Schofield (1833–1882) also became a brevet Brigadier General of U.S. Volunteers during the American Civil War, originally volunteering with the 1st Missouri Volunteer Infantry in November 1861 and promoted to Captain in the 1st Missouri Light Artillery after the Siege of Vicksburg, and rising to command the 2nd Regiment Missouri Volunteer Light artillery and ultimately being commissioned as a Major in the Regular Army after the Civil War and serving in the 10th Cavalry and later the 6th Cavalry on the Western Frontier, and for whom the .45 caliber Smith and Wesson Schofield revolver was named. Another brother Charles Brewster Schofield (1849–1901) graduated from West Point in 1870. C.B. Schofield later served as his Gen. J.M. Schofield's aide during the Indian Wars from 1878–1885. After rising to the rank of Captain during the Spanish–American War, he died of a heart attack in Matanzas, Cuba in 1901 and was also buried at Arlington National Cemetery. While Gen. John Schofield was in charge of Military District No. 1 in Virginia, his brother Elisha McAllister Schofield (1835–1870) was the assessor for the City of Richmond, Virginia and was among many killed on April 26, 1870 as a result of the infamous collapse of the balcony at the State Capitol during a session of the Virginia Court of Appeals. His son in law, Brig. Gen. Avery Delano Andrews and his wife Mary Campbell Schofield Andrews are also buried at Arlington National Cemetery.

Death and legacy
Before his death, Schofield became the last surviving member of Andrew Johnson's cabinet. His memoirs, Forty-six Years in the Army, were published in 1897. General Schofield became an honorary companion of the Military Order of Foreign Wars.

General Schofield died at St. Augustine, Florida on March 4, 1906. He is buried in Arlington National Cemetery. Schofield Barracks, Hawaii are named in his honor.

Today, Schofield is also remembered for a lengthy quotation that all cadets at the United States Military Academy at West Point, The Citadel, Officer Candidate School at Fort Benning, and the United States Air Force Academy are required to memorize. It is an excerpt from his graduation address to the class of 1879 at West Point:

Medal of Honor citation

Rank and organization:
Major, 1st Missouri Infantry. Place and date: At Wilsons Creek, Mo., August 10, 1861. Entered service at: St. Louis, Mo. Born: September 29, 1831, Gerry, N.Y. Date of issue: July 2, 1892.
Citation:
Was conspicuously gallant in leading a regiment in a successful charge versus the enemy.

The medal was recommended by Schofield himself when he was interim U.S. Secretary of War (1868–69). Historian Benson Bobrick is critical of this and notes the vagueness of the details in the citation.

General Schofield was posthumously entitled to the Civil War Campaign Medal and the Indian Campaign Medal.  Both medals were created in 1907, a year after Schofield died.

Dates of rank

See also

 List of Medal of Honor recipients
 List of American Civil War Medal of Honor recipients: Q–S
 List of American Civil War generals (Union)

Notes

References
 
 Bobrick, Benson. Master of War: The Life of General George H. Thomas. New York: Simon & Schuster, 2009. .
 Eicher, John H., and David J. Eicher. Civil War High Commands. Stanford, CA: Stanford University Press, 2001. .
 Einolf, Christopher J. George Thomas: Virginian for the Union. Norman: University of Oklahoma Press, 2007. .
 McDonough, James L. "John Schofield as Military Director of Reconstruction in Virginia." Civil War History, September 1969, pp. 237–256.
 Schofield, John M. Forty-Six Years in the Army. Norman: University of Oklahoma Press, 1998. . First published 1897 by The Century Co.

External links
 
 
 
 

1831 births
1906 deaths
Union Army generals
People of Missouri in the American Civil War
People of New York (state) in the American Civil War
Burials at Arlington National Cemetery
United States Army Medal of Honor recipients
People from Chautauqua County, New York
United States Secretaries of War
United States Military Academy alumni
Superintendents of the United States Military Academy
Washington University in St. Louis faculty
Andrew Johnson administration cabinet members
19th-century American politicians
American Civil War recipients of the Medal of Honor
New York (state) Republicans
Missouri Republicans
Florida Republicans
Commanding Generals of the United States Army
Washington University physicists